Scott Smith may refer to:

Entertainment
Scott D. Smith (born 1953), American sound engineer
Scott Michael Smith (born 1984), American record producer and audio engineer
Scott Smith (author) (born 1965), American novelist and screenwriter
Scott Smith (director), Canadian director
Scott Smith (musician) (1955–2000), bassist of Loverboy

Sports
Scott Smith (athlete) (born 1986), American long-distance runner
Scott Smith (field hockey) (born 1972), Canadian field hockey player
Scott Smith (ice hockey) (born 1966), Canadian ice hockey executive and administrator 
Scott Smith (footballer, born 1975), New Zealand soccer player
Scott Smith (footballer, born 1992), Scottish footballer (Hibernian FC, Dumbarton FC)
Scott Smith (footballer, born 1995), Scottish footballer (Dundee United FC)
Scott Smith (footballer, born 2001), Welsh footballer (Wigan Athletic)
Scott Smith (figure skater) (born 1981), American figure skater
Scott Smith (fighter) (born 1979), American mixed martial artist
Scott Smith (speedway rider), English speedway rider

Politics
Scott Smith (Arizona politician) (born 1956), mayor of Mesa, Arizona
Scott Smith (Canadian politician) (born 1959), Canadian politician
Scott Smith (Wyoming politician), member of the Wyoming State House

Other
Scott Smith (activist) (1948–1995), Harvey Milk's lover
Scott Smith (futurist) (born 1967), futurist
 Scott L. Smith Jr. (born 1983), American author and attorney